The following is a list of libraries in Brazil. The primary professional organization of librarians in the country is the Brazilian Federation of Associations of Librarians, Information Scientists and Institutions; they are additionally represented by the Brazilian Federal Council of Librarianship ( at the government level.

Libraries in Brazil
 Biblioteca Nacional do Rio de Janeiro
 Sistema Integrado de Bibliotecas da USP, São Paulo pt
 Sistema de Bibliotecas e Informação da UFRJ, Rio de Janeiro
 Biblioteca Mário de Andrade, São Paulo 
 Biblioteca Central (UnB), Brasília
 Sistema de Bibliotecas da UFMG, Minas Gerais
 Sistema de Bibliotecas da Unicamp, São Paulo
 Sistema de Bibliotecas da UFPE, Pernambuco
 Sistema Universitário de Bibliotecas da Universidade Federal da Bahia
 , Pará
  
 Biblioteca Pública do Estado de Pernambuco
 
 Biblioteca Comunitária da UFSCar, São Paulo 
 , Minas Gerais
 
 Biblioteca Pública Epiphânio Dória, Sergipe
 
 , Maranhão
 Biblioteca Comunitária Carlos Castelo Branco - UFPI, Piauí
 Biblioteca Municipal Orígenes Lessa, São Paulo
 , Ceará
 
 
  
 Biblioteca Pública do Estado de Alagoas
 
 Biblioteca Pública Estadual Pio Vargas, Goiás 
 Biblioteca Pública Câmara Cascudo, Rio Grande do Norte
 , Rio de Janeiro
 Biblioteca Pública de Brasília
 , Amapá
 , São Paulo
 Biblioteca Pública Estadual Estevão de Mendonça, Mato Grosso
 Biblioteca Publica Estadual Doutor Isaías Paim, Mato Grosso do Sul
 Biblioteca Municipal de Ipatinga, Minas Gerais
 Biblioteca Pública Estadual Levy Cúrcio da Rocha, Espírito Santo
 
 , São Paulo
 Biblioteca Pública Estadual Darcy Cardeal, Tocantins

See also 

 List of archives in Brazil
 History of the book in Brazil
 Instituto Nacional do Livro
 Lista das maiores bibliotecas públicas do Brasil

References

This article incorporates information from the Portuguese Wikipedia.

Further reading

in English
 

in Portuguese
 
 
  
 
 
 

 
Brazil
Libraries
Libraries